Pius Anthony Benincasa (July 8, 1913 – August 13, 1986) was a bishop of the Catholic Church in the United States. He served as an auxiliary bishop of the Diocese of Buffalo from 1964 to 1986.

Biography
Born in Niagara Falls, New York, Benincasa was ordained a priest on March 27, 1937, for the Diocese of Buffalo.  On May 8, 1964 Pope Paul VI appointed him as the Titular Bishop of Buruni and Auxiliary Bishop of Buffalo.  He was consecrated by Bishop James A. McNulty on June 29, 1964. The principal co-consecrators were Archbishop Celestine Damiano of Camden and Bishop James Navagh of Paterson.  He attended the third and fourth sessions of the Second Vatican Council (1964-1965).  Benincasa served as auxiliary bishop until his death on August 13, 1986, at the age of 73.

References

1913 births
1986 deaths
American Roman Catholics
People from Niagara Falls, New York
Participants in the Second Vatican Council
Roman Catholic Diocese of Buffalo
20th-century American Roman Catholic titular bishops
Religious leaders from New York (state)
Catholics from New York (state)